Elaeocarpus reticulatus, commonly known as blueberry ash, ash quandong, blue olive berry, fairy petticoats, fringe tree, koda, lily of the valley tree and scrub ash, is species of flowering plant in the family Elaeocarpaceae, and is endemic to eastern Australia. It is a shrub or small tree with oblong to elliptic leaves, racemes of white or pink flowers and blue, oval to spherical fruit.

Description
The leaves are more or less glabrous, often turn red before falling, have regular teeth along the edges, small domatia and a prominent network of veins on both surfaces.

Taxonomy
Elaeocarpus reticulatus was first formally described in 1809 by James Edward Smith in Abraham Rees's The Cyclopaedia from specimens collected near Port Jackson by John White. The specific epithet (reticulatus) means "with the appearance of a net".

Distribution and habitat
Blueberry ash often grows in tall eucalypt forest, in or near rainforest, often in moist gullies, but also found on stony ridges. It occurs along the east coast of Australia from Fraser Island in Queensland to Flinders Island in Tasmania. In New South Wales it is found from sea level to the ranges and in Victoria to the east of Wilsons Promontory where it is often locally common.

Ecology
The fruits of E. reticulatus are eaten by birds, including wonga pigeons, crimson rosellas, figbirds, white-headed pigeons and olive-backed orioles and the regent bowerbird collects them to decorate its bower.

Use in horticulture
Blue berry ash is described as "an outstanding specimen tree for coastal gardens". Propagation of the plant can be achieved from semi-hardwood cuttings taken in warmer weather, but germination from seed can take several years. The shrub is hardy in most situations and can be grown in shade to full sun.

References 

reticulatus
Oxalidales of Australia
Flora of Queensland
Flora of New South Wales
Flora of Victoria (Australia)
Flora of Tasmania